Forum Gdańsk, often shortened to Forum is a Polish shopping mall located in Gdańsk and opened in 2018.

History 
The mall was built in the lands formerly occupied by the Hay and Crayfish markets. The mall was originally called Forum Radunia.

Design 
The design of the mall is primarily modern. A channel of the Radunia flows through it, which is one of the defining traits of the mall. It is a building complex, as can be seen from the outside. On the upper floor, a Helios cinema occupies most of the area. It is divided into three zones; each has its own design.

Doubts and controversies 
Originally, the mall was supposed to be a group of smaller, more scattered buildings. After a change in the building plan, great opposition against it began, calling it "ignorant of the scale and character of Śródmieście".

Forum Gdańsk was planned to be opened on 16 May 2018, though the building did not have the permission to open, so it was delayed. After two days of silence, on 18 May, the opening date was announced as the 25th due to a great number of people waiting for the mall to open.

There was a major legal controversy surrounding the Radunia Channel and the preservation of its status as a monument. After a year-long legal battle regarding the definition of monument in Polish law, the (at this time, covered) channel was filled with water in November 2019.

References 

Shopping malls in Poland
Buildings and structures in Gdańsk
2018 establishments in Poland